The Europa Imaging System (EIS) is a visible spectrum wide and narrow angle camera on board the planned Europa Clipper mission  that will map most of Europa at  resolution, and will provide images of selected surface areas at up to 0.5 m resolution.

EIS will provide comprehensive data sets, including cartographic and three-dimensional geologic maps, regional and high-resolution digital topography, geographic information system data products, color and photometric data products, a geodetic control network tied to radar altimetry, and a database of plume-search observations.

Overview

EIS combines a narrow-angle camera (NAC) and a wide-angle camera (WAC) designed to address the reconnaissance goals. Both cameras operate on the visible spectrum (390 to 700 nm) and make use of push broom scanners for obtaining images with spectroscopic sensors.

The Principal investigator is Elizabeth Turtle.

Objectives

The objectives of the EIS instrument are:  

Characterize the ice shell by determining its thickness and correlating surface features with subsurface structures detected by ice penetrating radar.
Constrain formation processes of surface features and the potential for current activity by characterizing endogenic structures, surface units, global cross-cutting relationships, and relationships to Europa's subsurface structure, and by searching for evidence of recent activity, including potential plumes.
Characterize scientifically compelling landing sites and hazards by determining the nature of the surface at scales relevant to a potential Europa Lander.

General specifications

Narrow angle camera (NAC)
The NAC provides very high-resolution, stereo reconnaissance, generating 2 km wide swaths at 0.5 m pixel scale from 50 km altitude. NAC observations also include: near-global (>95%) mapping of Europa at ≤50 m pixel scale; regional and high-resolution stereo imaging at <1 m/pixel, and high phase angle observations for plume searches. The NAC will also perform high-phase-angle observations to search for potential plumes, even
when the spacecraft is distant from Europa. 

Wide angle camera (WAC)
The WAC will acquire stereo reconnaissance, generating digital topographic models with 32 m spatial scale and 4 m vertical precision from 50 km altitude.

References

Space imagers
Europa (moon)
Europa Clipper